is a passenger railway station located in the city of Tsuyama, Okayama Prefecture, Japan, operated by West Japan Railway Company (JR West).

Lines

Station layout
The station consists of one ground-level side platform serving a single bi-directional track. The station is unattended.

Adjacent stations

History
However, in 1923, the current Tsuyama Station opened in a more convenient location within Fukuoka Village (towns and villages centered on Tsuyama Town merged to form Tsuyama City in 1929). The station was renamed Tsuyamaguchi Station, on August 1, 1923. Until the Chugoku Railway was nationalized in 1944, this station was the border station between the Chugoku Railway and the Japanese Government Railway Sakubi Line (later Kishin Line branch line which became the Tsuyama Line). With the privatization of the Japan National Railways (JNR) on April 1, 1987, the station came under the aegis of the West Japan Railway Company. A new station building was completed in March 2020. The station is unattended.

Passenger statistics
In fiscal 2019, the station was used by an average of 15 passengers daily..

Surrounding area
The surrounding area is a residential zone.

See also
List of railway stations in Japan

References

External links

 Tsuyamaguchi Station Official Site

Railway stations in Okayama Prefecture
Tsuyama Line
Railway stations in Japan opened in 1898
Tsuyama